Xylophanes schwartzi is a moth of the  family Sphingidae. It is known from Ecuador.

The wingspan is 80–85 mm for males and 89–95 mm for females. It is similar to Xylophanes rhodochlora but distinguishable by the carmine-red undersides of the wings. The inner margin of the tegulae is edged with a very narrow pink line. The underside of the palps, thorax and abdomen are pale pink. The forewing upperside is olive-green. The discal spot is conspicuous, round and black. The first postmedian line is weak, the fourth is khaki and runs from the inner margin to the apex. The forewing base has a tuft of black scales beyond which a thin pink line runs along the inner margin for half its length. The underside of the forewing is dark grey or black as far as the end of the discal cell, the remainder of the wing is bright carmine-red with scattered black scales. The hindwing upperside is similar to Xylophanes nabuchodonosor, but the spots of the median band are obscured by a powdering of green scales. The underside of the hindwing is carmine-red with a dense sprinkling of scattered black scales, basally tending towards pale pink.

The larvae are snake-like. The head and three thoracic segments may be retracted into  abdominal segment one, which is swollen and adorned with a pair of light-ringed eye-spots.

References

schwartzi
Moths described in 1992
Endemic fauna of Ecuador
Moths of South America